Coleophora hartigi is a moth of the family Coleophoridae. It is found from Germany to Italy and Greece and from Austria to Bulgaria.

The larvae feed on Genista germanica. They create a trivalved composite leaf case of about 7 mm. The mouth angle is about 15°.

References

hartigi
Moths described in 1944
Moths of Europe